Edoardo Vona (born 16 December 1996) is an Italian professional footballer who plays as a centre back for  club Recanatese.

Club career
Born in Rome, Vona started his career on Latina Calcio and Santarcangelo youth sector.

After two season for Serie D clubs Virtus Verona and Ribelle, in 2016 he joined to Lega Pro club Latina Calcio. Vona made his professional debut on 28 August 2016 against Livorno.

On 9 December 2017, he signed with US Tortolì.

On 18 August 2020, Vona joined Serie D club Bisceglie. He left the club in August 2020.

On 8 August 2021, he returned to Serie C and signed with Imolese.

On 9 August 2022, Vona moved to Taranto. On 24 January 2023, he was released by Taranto to join Recanatese.

Personal life
His father Maurizio was also a footballer.

References

External links
 
 

1996 births
Living people
Footballers from Rome
Italian footballers
Association football central defenders
Serie C players
Serie D players
Santarcangelo Calcio players
U.S. Cremonese players
Virtus Verona players
S.S. Racing Club Roma players
Latina Calcio 1932 players
U.S. Castrovillari Calcio players
A.S. Bisceglie Calcio 1913 players
Imolese Calcio 1919 players
Taranto F.C. 1927 players
U.S.D. Recanatese 1923 players